Glan Conwy railway station is on the east bank of the River Conwy on the A470 road in the centre of the village of Llansanffraid Glan Conwy, Wales and is located on the Llandudno Junction to Blaenau Ffestiniog Conwy Valley Line. There are through services to Blaenau Ffestiniog.

History
The station was opened by the Conway and Llanrwst Railway on 17 June 1863, and was originally named Llansaintffraid; it was renamed Glan Conway on 1 January 1865.

Until around 1959, the station had its own Station Master. Afterwards, it was supervised by the Tal-y-Cafn station master. The staff comprised two porters working an early and late shift between them. A siding was provided which catered for coal and agricultural traffic. From 1954 to 1964 a camping coach was situated in the siding and used by holidaymakers.

The station was closed to passenger traffic on 26 October 1964, during the Beeching era, but reopened on 4 May 1970. On 12 May 1980 it was renamed Glan Conwy.

Facilities
The station buildings are in private occupation. The station is operated as an unstaffed halt and is a request stop - all tickets must be purchased on the train or prior to travel. Entrance is by a ramp from the end of the lower and original platform, where there is a small shelter.  The station is fitted with digital information screens for providing running information, along with a payphone and timetable poster boards.

Services
Five southbound and six northbound trains call on request Mon-Sat (approximately every three hours), with four trains each way on Sundays. As of March 2019 however, services from here were suspended due to major infrastructure damage to the track and formation caused by Storm Gareth. Several sections of embankment have been washed out by the River Conwy and needed repaired before the line reopened. A replacement bus service was in operation in the meantime. Further storm damage to the south (this time from Storm Ciara) in February 2020 with services again being suspended until the line was reopened on 28 September 2020.

References

Further reading

External links

Conwy Valley Railway

Llansanffraid Glan Conwy
Railway stations in Conwy County Borough
DfT Category F2 stations
Beeching closures in Wales
Railway request stops in Great Britain
Former London and North Western Railway stations
Railway stations in Great Britain opened in 1863
Railway stations in Great Britain closed in 1964
Railway stations in Great Britain opened in 1970
Reopened railway stations in Great Britain
Railway stations served by Transport for Wales Rail